Hup Hup is a Dutch football song. It was written in 1950 by KRO employee Jan de Cler and Dico van de Meer.

The lyrics are in Dutch, but roughly translate to:

Go Holland go
Don't let the lion stand around in his undershirt
[Lit.: "Let the lion not in his little shirt stand". Note that "hempie" is a popular diminutive for "hemd" which can be translated as "shirt". In this case it signifies the "shirt" being casual.]
Go Holland go
Don't put slippers on the beast
[Lit.: "Pull the little animal no slippers on ". Note that "beesie" is a popular diminutive for "beest" which can be translated as "animal". In this case it means the animal is beloved.]
Go Holland go
Don't let them defeat you on the field
[Lit.: "Let you out the field not beat " Note that the order of the words in this sentence is altered to better fit the melody]
Because the lion in football shoes
Dares to take the whole world on
[Lit.: "Dares the whole world on" Note that durft implies the task dared to be done is dangerous, or requires courage.]

Dutch lyrics:
Hup Holland Hup
Laat de leeuw niet in zijn hempie staan
Hup Holland Hup
Trek het beesie geen pantoffels aan
Hup Holland Hup
Laat je uit 't veld niet slaan
Want de leeuw op voetbalschoenen
Durft de hele wereld aan

References

Football in the Netherlands
Football songs and chants